The IIFA Lifetime Achievement Award is an Indian cinema prize, one of International Indian Film Academy Awards.

List of Honourees
The recipients of this award are listed below.

References

International Indian Film Academy Awards
Lifetime achievement awards